Apollodorus (Greek: Ἀπολλόδωρος Apollodoros) was a popular name in ancient Greece. It is the masculine gender of a noun compounded from Apollo, the deity, and doron, "gift"; that is, "Gift of Apollo." It may refer to:

Note: A few persons appear in more than one section.

Artists
 Apollodorus (painter), Athenian painter who lived at the end of the 5th century BC and introduced great improvements in perspective and chiaroscuro
 Apollodorus (sculptor), Greek sculptor in bronze so picky he often broke his works in pieces after he finished them

Authors
 Apollodorus, author of the Bibliotheca, sometimes called "Pseudo-Apollodorus" to distinguish him from Apollodorus of Athens (above), with whom he was sometimes confused
 Apollodorus of Carystus, New Comedy playwright
 Apollodorus of Erythrae, ancient Greek writer
 Apollodorus of Gela, New Comedy playwright
 Apollodorus of Lemnos, ancient Greek writer on agriculture
 Apollodorus of Tarsus, tragic poet
 Apollodorus of Telmessus, writer on dreams
 Apollodorus the Epicurean, Athenian philosopher and author of the Life of Epicurus, head of the Epicurean school in Athens

Historians
 Apollodorus of Artemita, Greek historian of the Parthian empire
 Apollodorus of Athens (c. 180 BC–after 120 BC), Greek historian and grammarian

Oratory
 Apollodorus of Athens (c. 180 BC–after 120 BC), Greek historian and grammarian
 Apollodorus of Cumae, Greek grammarian
 Apollodorus of Cyrene, Greek grammarian
 Apollodorus of Pergamon, 1st century BC rhetorician

Philosophers
 Apollodorus the Epicurean, Athenian philosopher and author of the Life of Epicurus, head of the Epicurean school in Athens
 Apollodorus of Phaleron (c. 429–4th century BC), follower of Socrates and narrator of the dialogue described by Plato in his Symposium
 Apollodorus of Seleucia, Stoic philosopher

Rulers and generals
 Apollodorus (general), Athenian general of the 4th century BC
 Apollodorus of Amphipolis, Macedonian cavalry general under Alexander the Great
 Apollodorus of Cassandreia (died 276 or 275 BC), a tyrant of the city of Cassandreia
 Apollodorus of Susiana, satrap of Susiana appointed in 220 BC

Other
 Apollodorus (jurist), Greco-Roman jurist
 Apollodorus (physician), two physicians mentioned by Pliny the Elder
 Apollodorus (runner), 1st century Macedonian runner who won the Olympics
 Apollodorus of Acharnae (394–after 343), Athenian politician and subject of many of Demosthenes' speeches
 Apollodorus of Boeotia, Greek ambassador
 Apollodorus of Cyzicus, two different persons from ancient Greece, one mentioned by Plato, the other by Diogenes Laërtius
 Apollodorus of Damascus, 2nd century Nabataean architect and engineer
 Apollodorus of Macedonia, Macedonian scribe, secretary to King Philip V of Macedon
 Apollodorus of Nicaea, mentioned by 6th century writer Stephanus of Byzantium
 Apollodorus Logisticus, ancient Greek mathematician
 Apollodorus Pyragrus, 1st century BC Sicilian mentioned by Cicero
 Apollodorus the Sicilian, loyal follower of Cleopatra

See also 
 Apollodorus of Smyrna, a copyist error for Apollonides of Smyrna
 Apollo (disambiguation) 
 Apollinaris (disambiguation)
 Apollonia (disambiguation) 
 Apollonius (disambiguation)

Greek masculine given names
Theophoric names